The Talaash (Persian for "Endeavor") is an Iranian  long-range mobile surface-to-air missile system unveiled in November 2013.

Design
It is designed to fire the Sayyad-2 missile, but may also be used to fire the Sayyad-3. The fire-control radar that the Talaash system uses is a Hafez 3D phased array radar.

See also 
 Sayyad-4 (missile)

References

Surface-to-air missiles of Iran
Guided missiles of Iran
Military equipment introduced in the 2010s